Bruce Peddie is an American college baseball coach and former player. He is an assistant baseball coach at the University of Saint Mary. Peddie played college baseball at Mansfield University of Pennsylvania from 1984 to 1987. He previously served as head baseball coach at the University of New Orleans from 2010 to 2013, and the head baseball coach for the University of Louisiana at Monroe, from 2014 to 2017. In 1994, Peddie managed the Harwich Mariners, a collegiate summer baseball team in the prestigious Cape Cod Baseball League.

Head coaching record

References

External links
 ULMWarhawks.com bio

Cape Cod Baseball League coaches
Living people
New Orleans Privateers baseball coaches
Louisiana–Monroe Warhawks baseball coaches
Mansfield Mounties baseball coaches
Mansfield Mounties baseball players
Shippensburg Red Raiders baseball coaches
Year of birth missing (living people)
Place of birth missing (living people)
Saint Mary Spires baseball coaches